Taschen is an art book publisher from Cologne, Germany

Taschen may also refer to:
 Angelika Taschen (born 1959), German dancer, art historian and publisher
 Benedikt Taschen (born 1961), German art book publisher
 Marlene Taschen (born 1985), daughter of Benedikt Taschen